Blessed Conrad of Ottobeuren OSB, (12th century – 27 July 1227), was abbot of Ottobeuren from 1191 to 27 July 1227.

Life 
He was elected abbot in 1191 and held the office for the next 34 years to his death. During his abbacy he was twice forced to rebuild his monastery. Firstly he rebuilt ruins and restore the heavily devastated monastery, but after completing first reconstruction, his work was destroyed by fire in 1217. He again renovated the abbey buildings. In 1204-1205 he was awarded by Rome the right to officiate with pontificalia: mitre, ring and sandals - usual award for abbots, but this right will be granted to every abbot of Ottobeuren in 1238. In 1205 third church was consecrated by bishop of Freising Otto II. In 1220 he succeeded to subordinate local parish church to Ottobeuren Abbey. He died in 1227, described by the Benedictines as a "lover of the brethren and of the poor".

Art 
He was a patron of art and artists, artists works under his ruler flourished. Tradition says that Christ spoke to him from Gnadenkreuz, the crucifix will later be consider as miraculous, and he later received many graces.

Veneration 
Evidences of his cult date from 1555, when his remains were firstly translated. Since 1772 when his body was secondly translated, he rests in the same tomb, where blessed Rupert rests - at Ottobeuren main church.

See also
Ottobeuren Abbey
Saint Conrad
Conrad (name)

References 

12th-century births
Year of birth uncertain
German saints
1227 deaths
German beatified people
Beatified people
German abbots
Benedictine abbots
Benedictine beatified people